Jaf or JAF may refer to:
 Jaff (Kurdish tribe)
 Jaf, Iran, a village in Kermanshah Province, Iran
 JAF (cartoonist), cartoonist for The Village Voice
 JAF (musician), Argentinian singer, songwriter and musician
 Jaish al-Fatah, a Syrian militant coalition in the Syrian Civil War
 Japan Air Self-Defense Force
 Japan Automobile Federation, a member of the FIA
 JAF Japan Armwrestling Federation
 Japanese Anarchist Federation, an anarchist organisation active in Japan from 1946 to 1968
 JavaBeans Activation Framework
 James A. Fitzpatrick Nuclear Generating Station
 James Alex Fields
 Jetairfly, a Belgian airline
 Jordanian Armed Forces
 Kankesanturai Airport near Jaffna, Sri Lanka